Basin City is an unincorporated community and census-designated place (CDP) in Franklin County, Washington, United States. The population was 1,092 at the 2010 census, up from 968 at the 2000 census.

History
The town of Basin City was laid out in the 1950s on land owned by dry-land farmer Loen Bailie. The town was established to support the local agricultural community which was being opened to irrigation through the Columbia Basin Project. The new settlers to the area consisted primarily of young farmers from Idaho and southwestern Oregon and World War II veterans, who received preferential status on the purchase of federal lands that were sold as part of the project. Early crops included sugar beets, alfalfa, corn, asparagus, wheat and barley. Later, potatoes, beans, carrots, and onions also became important, while sugar beet production stopped due to closure of a local sugar beet plant. A large number of orchards were planted, and the area is now a major supplier of the famous Washington apples. Cherries and other fruits are also produced locally.

Geography
Basin City is located in northwestern Franklin County at  (46.591416, -119.149325). As the name implies, it lies in a basin. Basin Hill also extends  to the north, where it is called Sage Hill and then rises a bit higher at Radar Hill, named for an old World War II radar base installed at the peak. A little further to the northwest lie the Saddle Mountains. Bailie's Lake, a small lake formed by irrigation runoff, lies to the northwest of town and provides opportunities for fishing and hunting.

Although the CDP itself is quite small, it serves as the heart of a much larger agricultural community extending for miles in all directions.

Demographics
As of the census of 2000, there were 968 people, 219 households, and 204 families residing in the CDP. The population density was 302.0 people per square mile (116.4/km2). There were 221 housing units at an average density of 69.0/sq mi (26.6/km2). The racial makeup of the CDP was 55.68% White, 0.62% Native American, 0.31% Asian, 20.76% from other races, and 22.62% from two or more races. Hispanic or Latino of any race were 76.14% of the population.

There were 219 households, out of which 68.0% had children under the age of 18 living with them, 71.7% were married couples living together, 13.2% had a female householder with no husband present, and 6.4% were non-families. 4.1% of all households were made up of individuals, and 1.8% had someone living alone who was 65 years of age or older. The average household size was 4.42 and the average family size was 4.41.

In the CDP, the age distribution of the population shows 43.6% under the age of 18, 13.9% from 18 to 24, 29.1% from 25 to 44, 10.4% from 45 to 64, and 2.9% who were 65 years of age or older. The median age was 20 years. For every 100 females, there were 110.9 males. For every 100 females age 18 and over, there were 114.1 males.

The median income for a household in the CDP was $29,444, and the median income for a family was $31,071. Males had a median income of $23,438 versus $21,071 for females. The per capita income for the CDP was $8,461. About 22.9% of families and 18.0% of the population were below the poverty line, including 16.1% of those under age 18 and none of those age 65 or over.

Freedom Rodeo
The Basin City Freedom Rodeo was first staged on July 4th, 2020 as a peaceful protest against Washington State's coronavirus lockdown restrictions. The Basin City Memorial Park rodeo grounds were restored specifically for the event after 40 years of not being used. The Bailie Memorial Youth Foundation donated the money for the restoration. Organizers spent a month leveling the rodeo grounds, installing bleachers, and putting in grass. The first event had two days of rodeo slack competitions, a parade, fireworks, and a dance both nights. The Freedom Rodeo is now an annual event.

References

Census-designated places in Washington (state)
Census-designated places in Franklin County, Washington